Habib Ayrout (1876 – 1956) was a Syro-Lebanese Egyptian who participated in the planning and construction of Heliopolis (Cairo suburb)./

Education
He was educated in Paris as an engineer-architect.  His sons were Henry Habib Ayrout, a Jesuit priest, his other two sons Charles and Max Ayrout, were also architects practicing in Cairo.

References

Egyptian architects
Egyptian people of Lebanese descent
1876 births
1956 deaths
Levantine-Egyptians